The 2010 California lieutenant gubernatorial election was held on November 2, 2010 to choose the Lieutenant Governor of California. The primary election was held on June 8, 2010. Incumbent Republican Lieutenant Governor Abel Maldonado, who was appointed to the office, ran for election to a full term and was defeated by Democratic Mayor Gavin Newsom of San Francisco. Lieutenant Governor Newsom started his four-year term on 10 January 2011.

Candidates 
The following were certified by the California Secretary of State as candidates in the primary election for lieutenant governor. Candidates who won their respective primaries and qualified for the general election are shown in bold.

American Independent 
 Jim King, a real estate broker and the party's nominee for the office in 2006 and 2002

Democratic 
 Janice Hahn, member of the Los Angeles City Council
 Eric Korevaar, businessman and scientist
 Gavin Newsom, Mayor of San Francisco

Green 
 James Castillo, cultural spiritual advisor

Libertarian 
 Pamela Brown, economics professor

Peace and Freedom 
 C. T. Weber, retired government analyst

Republican 
 Sam Aanestad, state senator representing the 4th district
 Bert Davis, businessman
 Yvonne Girard, judicial assistant
 Dave Harris, businessman
 Scott Levitt, attorney
 Abel Maldonado, incumbent Lieutenant Governor

Primary results

Democratic

Republican

Others

Opinion polls

Democratic primary

General election

General results

References

External links

Official campaign websites 
Sam Aanestad
Pamela Brown
James Castillo
Janice Hahn
Jim King
Eric Korevaar
Scott Levitt
Abel Maldonado
Gavin Newsom
C. T. Weber

Lieutenant Governor
California
2010
Gavin Newsom